The 2023–24 VCU Rams men's basketball team will represent Virginia Commonwealth University during the 2023–24 NCAA Division I men's basketball season. They will be led by seventh-year head coach is Mike Rhoades and played their home games at the Siegel Center in Richmond, Virginia as a member of the Atlantic 10 Conference.

Background 
The 2022–23 VCU Rams men's basketball team finished the season with a 27–8 overall record and a 15–3 record in the Atlantic 10 Conference. The program won both the Atlantic 10 regular season and tournament, their first since 2019 and 2015, respectively. VCU guard, Ace Baldwin Jr., was named the Atlantic 10 Conference Men's Basketball Player of the Year.

By winning the Atlantic 10 tournament, VCU earned their first berth into the NCAA Division I men's basketball tournament since 2021. The Rams were seeded 12th, their lowest seeding since 2012, where they played St. Mary's, a rematch of the 2017 tournament. VCU lost 53–61 to St. Mary's ending their tournament run.

Offseason

Departures

2023 recruits 
No players have officially committed to VCU.

Roster

References

External links
 VCU Basketball

VCU
VCU Rams men's basketball seasons
VCU Rams men's basketball
VCU Rams men's basketball